Yoganarsimha Temple is a Hindu Temple located in hill station Devarayanadurga near Tumkur in the state of Karnataka in India. Situated on the hilltop, surrounded by other hills and forests, the temple is dedicated to God Narsimha and Lakshmi. There is a Kalyani (well) near the temple.

References

Hindu temples in Tumkur district
Narasimha temples